The Asuras are a race of power-seeking deities in Hinduism.

Asura may also refer to:
 Asura (Buddhism), the lowest ranks of the deities of the Kāmadhātu
 Asura (moth), a genus of moths in the family Erebidae
 Asura (Samurai Showdown), a character in Samurai Showdown
 Asura (Soul Eater), a character in the Soul Eater manga and anime series
 Asura (video game), a Thai MMORPG
 Asura (2001 film), an Indian film
 Asura (2012 film), a Japanese film
 Asura (2015 film), a Telugu film
 Asura (2018 film), a Chinese film
 Asura: The City of Madness, a South Korean film
 Asura, a subclass in the MMORPG Dungeon Fighter Online
 Asura, a spaceship used by the Time-Space Administration Bureau (TSAB) in Magical Girl Lyrical Nanoha
 Asura, a summonable spirit in the Final Fantasy series
 Asura, a goblinoid race in the MMORPG Guild Wars
 Asuras, a predominantly chaotic good race of celestials in the Dungeons & Dragons roleplaying game
 Ahura, a class of Zoroastrian spirits
 Asur people of India
 Asuras (Stargate), home world of the Asurans, a replicator race in the TV-series Stargate Atlantis
 Asura's Wrath, a video game by Capcom

See also 
 
 Ashur (disambiguation)
 Ashura (disambiguation)
 Asuri (disambiguation)